Powells Creek is a  long 3rd order tributary to the Hyco River in Person County, North Carolina.

Variant names
According to the Geographic Names Information System, it has also been known historically as: 
Crowder Creek
Storys Creek

Course
Powells Creek rises about 2 miles north of Cunningham, North Carolina.  It then flows east and turns southeast into Person County, North Carolina to join the Hyco River about 3 miles south-southwest of Harmony, Virginia.

Watershed
Powells Creek drains  of area, receives about 45.9 in/year of precipitation, has a wetness index of 379.41, and is about 61% forested.

References

Rivers of North Carolina
Rivers of Virginia
Rivers of Halifax County, Virginia
Rivers of Person County, North Carolina
Tributaries of the Roanoke River